Jared Veldheer (born June 14, 1987) is a former American football offensive tackle. He was drafted by the Oakland Raiders in the third round of the 2010 NFL Draft. He played college football at Hillsdale.

Early life and college
Veldheer was born in Grand Rapids, Michigan to Jim and Mary Veldheer. He has two siblings, one older brother (Aaron Veldheer) and a younger sister (Meghan Veldheer). Jared graduated from Forest Hills Northern High School in 2005. In high school, Veldheer was named Most Valuable Lineman and played two years of varsity basketball, and his high school football coach Brent Myers graduated from Hillsdale College, the NCAA Division II college that Veldheer would attend. In 2008, Veldheer was co-captain of the Hillsdale Chargers football team. After the 2009 season, the American Football Coaches Association named him First-team All-American. Veldheer is an alumnus of the Delta Sigma Phi fraternity.

Professional career

Oakland Raiders

Veldheer was selected by the Oakland Raiders in the third round (69th overall) of the 2010 NFL Draft. At the conclusion of the 2010 preseason, he was named Oakland's starting center, beating out veteran Samson Satele. However, after the first game, Veldheer was moved back to offensive tackle, replaced at center by Satele for the rest of the season, and began sharing time with veteran Mario Henderson. By midseason, Veldheer had supplanted Henderson to become the Raiders' full-time starting left tackle. On opening day of the 2011 NFL season, he started at left tackle next to rookie Stefen Wisniewski and the offensive line cleared the way for 190 rushing yards and a victory over the Denver Broncos.

Arizona Cardinals
On March 11, 2014, Veldheer signed a five-year, $35 million contract with the Arizona Cardinals. On October 31, 2016, Veldheer was placed on injured reserve after tearing his right triceps in Week 8.

In 2017, Veldheer started the first 13 games at right tackle before being placed on injured reserve on December 11, 2017 with an ankle injury.

Denver Broncos
On March 23, 2018, Veldheer was traded to the Denver Broncos for a 2018 sixth round pick. He started 12 games at right tackle, missing four games with a knee injury.

New England Patriots
On May 13, 2019, Veldheer signed with the New England Patriots on a one-year deal. On May 21, 2019, just a week after signing with the Patriots, Veldheer announced his retirement from the NFL; the Patriots used his roster spot to sign Gunner Olszewski. He was subsequently placed on the reserve/retired list by the team, but was waived from the list on November 26, 2019, after expressing interest in playing again.

Green Bay Packers
On November 27, 2019, Veldheer was claimed off waivers by the Green Bay Packers. He was reinstated from the reserve/retired list on November 29, and the team received a roster exemption for him. He was activated on December 9, 2019. He saw his first action as a Packer on December 23 during a Week 16 victory over the Minnesota Vikings. On December 29, during a Week 17 victory over the Detroit Lions, Veldheer stepped in at right tackle when starter Bryan Bulaga left the game with a concussion and did not return.

On September 21, 2020, Veldheer announced his retirement again despite receiving a contract offer from the Dallas Cowboys.

Indianapolis Colts
Veldheer had a free agent visit with the Indianapolis Colts on December 28, 2020 He was signed to their practice squad on December 31. He was elevated to the active roster on January 2 and 8, 2021, for the team's week 17 and wild card playoff games against the Jacksonville Jaguars and Buffalo Bills, and reverted to the practice squad after each game.

Green Bay Packers (second stint)
On January 12, 2021, the Green Bay Packers signed Veldheer off of the Colts' practice squad. He was placed on the reserve/COVID-19 list one day later.

On May 27, 2021, Veldheer was suspended for six games for violating the league's performance-enhancing drug policy. After his suspension was announced, he said the positive drug test resulted from taking Clomifene and he would subsequently retire from the NFL. In August 2021, Veldheer became a cook for schoolchildren in Grand Rapids.

References

External links

Hillsdale Chargers bio

1987 births
Living people
Players of American football from Grand Rapids, Michigan
American people of Dutch descent
American football centers
American football offensive tackles
Hillsdale Chargers football players
Oakland Raiders players
Arizona Cardinals players
Denver Broncos players
New England Patriots players
Green Bay Packers players
Indianapolis Colts players